Frederick Thomas Seelye  (1879–1962) was a notable New Zealand analytical chemist and lecturer. He was born in Dunedin, Otago, New Zealand in 1879. He was elected a Fellow of the Royal Society Te Apārangi in 1944.

References

1879 births
1962 deaths
New Zealand chemists
Scientists from Dunedin

Fellows of the Royal Society of New Zealand